Abrasion resistant steel is a high-carbon alloy steel that is produced to resist wear and stress. There are several grades of abrasion resistant steel, including AR200, AR235, AR400, AR450, AR500 and AR600.

Quenching & Tempering 
Abrasion resistant steel undergoes a two-step heat treatment process called quenching and tempering, which alters the steel’s grain structure to increase hardness and toughness.

During the quenching phase, the steel is heated to an above-critical temperature and is then rapidly cooled with water. The steel is then re-heated to a below-critical temperature and air cooled, which is the tempering phase.

Brinell Hardness 
The hardness of abrasion resistant steel is determined by a Brinell hardness test. This test uses a small steel ball to inflict force on a material. The indentation created by the steel ball is then measured and used to calculate Brinell hardness number (BHN).

Standards for Brinell hardness testing are regulated by ASTM International under E10 specifications.

Applications 
Abrasion resistant steel is typically used in applications requiring high wear resistance, including backhoe buckets and teeth, bulldozer blades, dump truck beds, ore and coal chutes, augers and aggregate conveyors.

References 

Steel